The League of Mayapan (Yucatec: Luub Mayapan Maya glyphs) was a confederation of Maya states in the Postclassic period of Mesoamerica on the Yucatan peninsula.

The main members of the league were the Itza, the Tutul-Xiu, Mayapan, and Uxmal.

Mayapan means flag of the Maya.

Before the League

The Itza
The Itza were known as water witches. According to the Chilam Balam of Chumayel, in 325 they started immigrating to Bacalar from Peten. From there many of them continued northwest, where they conquered the classical Maya city of Uuc Yabnal and renamed it as Chichen Itza. They lived there from 550 to 692. After that for economic and political reasons the Itza moved to Chakan Putum, where they lived until 928 when they returned to Chichen Itza.

The Tutul Xiu
The Tutul-Xiu were known as overflowing virtue. In the Seventh century they migrated to Yucatan. There their leader Ah Suytok Tutul Xiu, nicknamed Chac Uitzil Hun, founded Uxmal.
The date that this happened is disputed by a codex from Tizimin, and another from Mani.
In 869 Ah Mekat Tutul Xiu ruler of the Tutul Xius moved to Uxmal from Nonohual.
Nonohual's location is unknown, but was probably in Peten, it also might have been another name for Potonchán in Tabasco or Tula.
The Tutul Xius were the main group of people forcing the Itzas out of Chichen Itza.

Cocom
The Cocom were known as the lineage of the wood pigeon. They lived farther to the west and forced the Itza out of Chakan Putum. The Itzas spent forty years living in the rainforest. They called it Xulucmul (living under the trees in ash and poverty).

Foundation 
Before the foundation of the league, the Toltecs invaded Yucatan. Their leader was the semi-mythical king Kukulcan. Whether Kukulkan was real or not, the Toltecs had influence over the Maya there.

"The indians who inhabited Chichen Itza, ruled by a great lord called Kukulcan, and showing this be true named the main building  Kukulcan, and say they came from the west and differing in whether entered before or after the Yzaes or with them, and said they were well prepared and had no wife or children, and say that after his return he was taken into Mexico by one of their gods and called Cezalcuati, [Quetzalcoatl]."
List of things Yucatan, Diego de Landa.

Ah Mekat Tutul Xiu, is considered the ruler who founded The League of Mayapan in 987. He unified Chichen Itza, Mayapan, and Uxmal. Chichen Itza being the main city, with a population of approximately 50,000 people. He continued to incorporate other areas, Zama (Tulum), Ichpatun, Itzamal, and The Cocom region.

 Hunac Ceel Cauich 

In 1175, the league began to disintegrate. A Cocom man named Ceel Cauich Ah was ritually thrown into the cenote of Chichen Itza (cenote being the a Spanish term for the Mayan word dzonot, which is a deep, karstik sinkhole filled with water). The Sacred Cenote of Chichen Itza was specially considered an entrance to the afterlife and thus a site of pilgrimage. It is 15 meters deep from the ground to the water surface and its very steep walls made almost impossible to climb out if thrown into. But Ceel managed to survive and climbed out, which he used as a sign of his divine right to rule and proclaimed himself Ajaw, a spiritual and political leader. He also renamed himself Hunac Ceel Cauich. The Itzáes did not fall for this ruse and refused to recognize his authority.
Ceel gathered many followers from Mayapan and The Cocom region. In 1194, Hunac Ceel Cauich declared war on Chac-Xib-Chac one of the K'ul Kokom, the four rulers of Chichén Itzá. The other three K'ul Kokom, and his brothers were Sac Xib Chac, Chac Ek Yuuan and Hun Yuuan Chac (also called uooh Puc). Ah Itzimthul Chac was also one of the Chac brothers, he ruled  Ichcanzihoo also known as T'ho in present-day Mérida.

 Legend of the depopulation of Chichen Itzá 

Scientific data points to the fact that Chichén Itzá declined before the rise of Mayapan as a regional power, but ongoing research is currently being done in several Maya sites, so there's not any chronological certainty yet.

However, traditional sources (which are often mixed with fantasy and legend) say that Hunac Ceel Cauich had a daughter named Sac Nicté (in Yucatec Maya Sac Nikté' meaning white flower).  Sac Nicté fell in love with a member of the royalty of Chichen Itzá named Canek (Kaan Ek in Yucatec, meaning black snake). When they met Sac Nicté was 15 and Canek was 21. This was the same day Canek was crowned ruler if the Itzá. The Itzá chose new ruler every Katún Ahau (period of almost 20 years). Based on this Canek became ruler of the Itzá on 22 November 1194. Sac Nicté and Canek instantly fell in love. Sac Nicté was destined, by prearranged marriage, to marry Ah Ulil, Batab of Izamal. Canek and Sac Nicté slept together, later Canek stayed awake all night crying because he knew he could not marry Sac Nicté. Ah Ulil and Sac Nicté's wedding was to take place 37 days after Canek's coronation (29 December 1194). Three days before, the wedding fiancés arrived in Uxmal. Gifts from all over Mayeb arrived, Gold, animal tusks, perfume, emeralds, and turtle shells filled with quetzal feather. These gifts came from distant and near cities - except nothing arrived from Chichen Itzá. On the Day of the wedding, Uxmal was decorated with ribbons, feather, plants, and brightly painted bows, the people of the city were dancing and having parties in the street. Ajaws, Batabs, Halch Uiniks'', Nobles, and other elites arrived with minstrels. Canek had been invited and he arrived, with him he brought the Itzáes sixty best soldiers. Canek and his warriors ran to the altar where Sac Nicté was being married. Incense was burning and a priest was chanting. Sac Nicté, Canek, and the sixty warriors fled Uxmal, everything had happened so fast that nobody was able to try and stop them. Hunac Ceel, Ah Ulil, and other leaders traveled with a large army to Chichen Itzá only to find the city completely abandoned. Sac Nicté led the Itzá to Nojpetén where they established a new Itza Kingdom.

Important people 
Ah Ulil
 Ah Itzimthul Chac: a Batab.
Chac-Xib-Chac: a ruler of Chichen Itza.
 Hapay Can: was probably a ruler of Chichen Itza.
 Sac Xib Chac: a ruler of Chichen Itza.
 Chac Ek Yuuan: a ruler of Chichen Itza.
 Hun Yuuan Chac (also called uooh Puc): a ruler of Chichen Itza.
 Ix Zacbeliz: a queen of Chichen Itza.
 Zac Xib Chac: Chac-Xib-Chacs brother.
 Uayom-chich: a priest.
 Uxmal Chac: a Batab and a priest.
 Cabal Xiu: a priest.
 Hunac Ceel
 Ah Mekat Tutul Xiu: founded the league.
 Ah Xiu Xupan: started the war that ended the league.
 Mo-Chel: a nobleman from Mayapan.
 Ah Yamazi: Batab of Yobain.
 Xkil Itzam Pech: Batab of Kini
 The Pech family
 The Cupul family
 The Cochuah famil
 The Cocom family
 The Xiu family
 The Chel family: descendants of Mo-Chel
 The Canul family
 The Cauich family

End of The League 

In 1441  Ah Xiu Xupan, the great ruler of Uxmal, was given the task of making war on the royal family of the Cocom, whom he managed to kill. Only one of the Cocom, who was in Honduras at the time, survived and later founded Tibolón.
The war between Uxmal and Cocom plunged the League into chaos. There was segregation in the provinces and several uprisings broke out. By 1461 the league was completely disintegrated.

After the war Yucatan broke up into seventeen Kuchkabals.

References

10th-century establishments in the Maya civilization
987 establishments
1461 disestablishments in North America
15th-century disestablishments in the Maya civilization
Mayapan, League of